Rose Schmits is a transgender Dutch ceramics artist working in the UK and best known for her role in the Channel Four TV show The Great Pottery Throw Down on which she is the kiln and firing technician. Schmits is from Delft and moved to the UK to study at the City & Guilds of London Art School. She won the Undergraduate Prize awarded by the Artists' Collecting Society in 2018 and the Artists Collecting Society Undergraduate Prize from the City & Guilds of London Art School in 2019. Schmits joined the show in 2021.

Schmits bases her work on the Delftware pottery technique. Her work includes:

 We Live in a Society Collection 
 Crawler Pot Collection 
 Trans Forms Collection 
 Creature from the Delft Canal 
 Galatea’s C***

References 

Living people
Year of birth missing (living people)
Dutch artists

Ceramists
Transgender artists